Garton on the Wolds is a village and civil parish on the Yorkshire Wolds in the East Riding of Yorkshire, England.

Background
The civil parish is formed by the village of Garton on the Wolds and the hamlet of Elmswell.
According to the 2011 UK Census, Garton parish had a population of 348, an increase on the 2001 UK Census figure of 299. On 1 April 1935 the parish of "Garton on the Wolds" was abolished and merged with Emswell with Little Driffield to form "Garton" parish. The parish council is still called "Garton on the Wolds Parish Council".

St Michael's and All Angels

Garton's church, St Michael's and All Angels, was designated a Grade I listed building in 1966 and is now recorded in the National Heritage List for England, maintained by Historic England. It is on the Sykes Churches Trail devised by the East Yorkshire Churches Group.

The church dates back to Norman times, circa 1132. In the 19th century it was restored by John Loughborough Pearson, with funding from Sir Tatton Sykes, 4th Baronet of nearby Sledmere House. Later his son, Sir Tatton Sykes, 5th Baronet, employed George Edmund Street to furnish the church. It was eulogised by Nicholas Pevsner and is a popular visitor attraction due to its unique interior; the walls and ceilings are decorated in colourful murals depicting various biblical scenes, in sharp contrast to the stark interior of many other churches, and it has highly geometric floors in the altar and nave. 
The mosaics in the sacristy are in the Cosmati style.

In 1823 Garton parish was in the Wapentake of Dickering, and the Liberty of St Peter. There existed a Methodist chapel, and a school which was partly supported by revenue from shares in the Driffield Navigation. Population at the time was 357. Occupations included twelve farmers, three tailors, two butchers, two grocers, two wheelwrights, a blacksmith, a boot & shoe maker, and the landlords of The Three Tuns and The Chase Inn public houses. There was also a schoolmaster and five gentlemen.

Garton was served by Garton railway station on the Malton and Driffield Railway between 1853 and 1950.

References

External links

Garton on the Wolds Parish Council
Garton on the Wolds CE Primary School

Villages in the East Riding of Yorkshire
Civil parishes in the East Riding of Yorkshire